The western red-billed hornbill (Tockus kempi) is a species of hornbill in the family Bucerotidae. It is found from Senegal and Gambia to southern Mauritania and western Mali. There are five species of red-billed hornbills generally recognized now, but all five were once considered conspecific. Some authorities still categorize the group as Tockus erythrorhynchus with the remaining four as its subspecies

Description 
Western red-billed hornbills are small hornbills in the genus Tockus. They have curved red beaks which are more orange on the lower beak and more bright red on the upper beak, with both ending with a dark orange colour. Their heads are greyish white and have black feathers along the back of their heads and neck. They have white plumage on their faces and large dark grey eye rings. Their sclera is dark brown and their pupils are black.  Their wings are like all red-billed hornbills, with large and small circles of white feathers surrounded by black feathers on the exterior and white on the upper half of the interior and black on the lower half of the interior. They have long tail feathers that are black on the exterior and a greyish white on the interior.

Gallery

References

Kemp, A.C. and W. Delport. 2002. Comments on the status of subspecies in the red-billed hornbill (Tockus erythrorhynchus) complex (Aves: Bucerotidae), with the description of a new taxon endemic to Tanzania. Annals of the Transvaal Museum 39: 1–8.
Delport, W., A.C. Kemp, and J.W.H. Ferguson. 2004. Structure of an African Red-billed Hornbill (Tockus erythrorhynchus rufirostris and T. e. damarensis) hybrid zone as revealed by morphology, behavior, and breeding biology. Auk 121: 565–586.

western red-billed hornbill
Birds of West Africa
western red-billed hornbill